Ben Lord is the drummer for the Brooklyn, NY Noise Rock band Up The Empire. He was previously the drummer for the bands Kilowatthours, Elliott, Bling Kong and Falling Forward.

References

American male drummers
Living people
Year of birth missing (living people)
Place of birth missing (living people)